Steenberg railway station is a Metrorail station on the Southern Line in Steenberg, a suburb of Cape Town. It is located on Henley Road, which is just off Military Road. The station is located on the edge of Steenberg, towards Kirstenhof and is alongside the Keyser River, which flows into Zandvlei.

Steenberg has a small taxi rank which only serves Grassy Park and Steenberg. Busses to Cape Town are only available at early times of the morning.

The station has an island platform, connected by a pedestrian bridge over the tracks. In normal operation, Platform 1 (the western platform) is used for trains travelling towards Cape Town, while Platform 2 (the eastern platform) is used for trains travelling towards Simon's Town.

Notable places nearby
 Zandvlei Estuary Nature Reserve
 Tokai
 Pollsmoor Prison

Railway stations in Cape Town
Metrorail Western Cape stations